goXuan (goXuan FM) is a Malaysian Chinese language radio station operated by Astro Radio Sdn Bhd The radio station went on air on 2 October 2017 and targets Chinese Generation Z listeners.

Frequency

Television satellite 
 Astro (television): Channel 877

References

External links 
 

2017 establishments in Malaysia
Radio stations established in 2017
Chinese-Malaysian culture in Kuala Lumpur
Radio stations in Malaysia
Chinese-language radio stations in Malaysia
Astro Malaysia Holdings